Headwind/Tailwind is an EP by Freiband (stage name of Frans De Waard). The EP features a track by Freiband and a remix by Bass Communion and was released on Frans De Waard's My Own Little Label.

Release
After releasing the EP Haze Shrapnel, which contained a Bass Communion track and a Freiband remix, Steven Wilson and Frans De Waard decided to switch roles. The result was an EP featuring a track by Freiband, titled "Headwind", as well as a remix by Bass Communion, using only the Freiband track as source material, titled "Tailwind".

Due to the success of Haze Shrapnel, Headwind/Tailwind was released as a 3" factory pressed CD rather than as a CD-R, like the majority of My Own Little Label releases, including Haze Shrapnel.

Track listing

References 

2008 EPs
Bass Communion albums